Obrona Częstochowy is a 1913 Polish historical film. It is based on a novel by Henryk Sienkiewicz.

Cast
Maria Dulęba as Olenka Billewiczówna 
Aleksander Zelwerowicz as Jan Onufry Zagloba 
Stefan Jaracz as Michal Wolodyjowski 
Bronisław Oranowski as Andrzej Kmicic 
Lucjan Wisniewski as Jan Skrzetuski 
Kazimierz Wojciechowski as Jan Skrzetuski 
Seweryna Broniszówna as Anna Borzobochata

References

External links
 

1913 films
Polish historical films
Polish silent films
Polish black-and-white films
Films based on works by Henryk Sienkiewicz
1910s historical films